The Fairfax Historic District in Valley, Alabama, was listed on the National Register of Historic Places in 1999.

It is a  area roughly bounded by River Road, Spring Street, Lamer Street, Derson Street, Combs Street, and Cussetta Road in Valley. The district includes 372 contributing buildings, a contributing structure, and four contributing sites.

The district is centered around a textile mill and the surrounding buildings, the majority of which are mill worker cottages. Other building include commercial, civic, recreational, and civic structures. The architect of the mill was a Mr. Agnew (or Agnue). The village was designed by landscape architect William B. Marquis, who later became a partner at Olmsted Brothers. Architectural styles include Colonial Revival, and Bungalow/Craftsman.

References

External links
Historic American Engineering Record (HAER) documentation, filed under Valley, Chambers County, AL:

Colonial Revival architecture in Alabama
Historic American Engineering Record in Alabama
Historic districts on the National Register of Historic Places in Alabama
National Register of Historic Places in Chambers County, Alabama